Allergy, Asthma & Immunology Research is a bimonthly peer-reviewed open access medical journal covering immunology. It was established in 2009 and is published by the Korean Academy of Asthma, Allergy and Clinical Immunology and the Korean Academy of Pediatric Allergy and Respiratory Disease; it is an official journal of both societies. The editor-in-chief is Hae-Sim Park (Ajou University). According to the Journal Citation Reports, the journal has a 2018 impact factor of 5.026.

References

External links

Immunology journals
Publications established in 2009
English-language journals
Bimonthly journals
Academic journals published by learned and professional societies